Hermien Dommisse (27 October 1915 – 24 March 2010) was a South African actress.

Life
Dommise was born in 1915. She made several films in South Africa including Die Kandidaat and Jannie totsiens. She was known for appearing in the long running bi-lingual South African TV soap "Egoli: Place of Gold".
Dommisse died in South Africa at a nursing home. She received a Fleur du Cap Theatre Lifetime Award in 1999.

References

1915 births
2010 deaths
South African film actresses
South African television actresses